Taractrocera archias is a butterfly of the family Hesperiidae. It is found in mainland south-eastern Asia (Burma, Thailand, Vietnam, Malaysia), Java and Lesser Sunda Islands (east to Timor and Kisar).

Subspecies
Taractrocera archias archias (Java, Bali and Banka)
Taractrocera archias samadha Fruhstorfer, 1910  (northern Burma)
Taractrocera archias quinta Swinhoe, 1913  (from Burma to Indochina and Malaya)
Taractrocera archias kisaga Frustorfer, 1910  (Lesser Sunda Islands)
Taractrocera archias bavius Mabille, 1891 (Lesser Sunda Islands)

External links
Phylogeny and biogeography of the genus Taractrocera Butler, 1870 (Lepidoptera: Hesperiidae), an example of Southeast Asian-Australian interchange
A note on three species of Taractrocera Butler (Lepidoptera: Hesperiidae)

Taractrocerini
Butterflies of Singapore
Butterflies of Indochina
Butterflies described in 1860
Taxa named by Baron Cajetan von Felder